Udarnoye is a rural locality (a selo) in Polyansky Selsoviet of Seryshevsky District, Amur Oblast, Russia. The population was 370 as of 2018. There are 7 streets.

Geography 
Udarnoye is located 7 km west of Seryshevo (the district's administrative centre) by road. Seryshevo is the nearest rural locality.

References 

Rural localities in Seryshevsky District